The 1910 Akron Indians season was their third season in existence. The team played in the Ohio League and posted a 6–2 record.

Schedule

Game notes

References
 Pro Football Archives: Akron Indians 1910

Akron Pros seasons
Akron Pros
Akron Pros